Sinangag, also called garlic fried rice or garlic rice, is a Filipino fried rice dish cooked by stir-frying pre-cooked rice with garlic. The rice used is preferably stale, usually leftover cooked rice from the previous day, as it results in rice that is slightly fermented and firmer. It is garnished with toasted garlic, rock salt, black pepper and sometimes chopped scallions. The rice grains are ideally loose and not stuck together.

It is rarely eaten on its own, but is usually paired with a "dry" meat dish such as tocino (bacon), longganisa (sausage), tapa (dried or cured meat), Spam, or daing (dried fish), as well as the addition of scrambled or fried eggs. Unlike other types of fried rice, it does not normally use ingredients other than garlic, in order not to overwhelm the flavour of the main dish. In the Visayas regions of the Philippines, sinangag was traditionally seasoned with asín tibuok.

Sinangag is a common part of a traditional Filipino breakfast and it usually prepared with leftover rice from the dinner before. Sometimes, it is cooked in the leftover sauces and oils from Philippine adobo, lessening food waste. Preparing sinangag from freshly-cooked rice is frowned upon in Filipino culture. It is one of the components of the tapsilog breakfast and its derivatives.

See also
 Aligue fried rice
 Bagoong fried rice
 Cuisine of the Philippines
 Fried rice
 Kiampong
 Kuning
 List of fried rice dishes
 List of garlic dishes
 Sinigapuna

References

Fried rice
Philippine rice dishes